UNSW Institute of Languages is the longest-standing provider of university English language courses in Australia and has been operating for over 40 years. Courses at the Institute assist international and local students in developing their general, professional and academic English skills for university admission, professional accreditation and personal development.
In addition to English language courses, the Institute also offers courses in language teacher training, test preparation for a range of English and foreign language proficiency exams and part-time study in 10 foreign languages.

Programs
The UNSW Institute of Languages offers courses for international and domestic students. Some courses prepare students for study at the UNSW Foundation Studies program at UNSW and other Australian universities, while others have been specifically designed for vocational or general purposes.  
There are different courses on offer for international and domestic students.

International students
International students can undertake study to address three main areas of English language ability:
 General English: includes preparatory studies for the Cambridge First Certificate in English  and the Cambridge Certificate in Advanced English
 Professional English: provides specific courses for students wishing to improve their proficiency in business, medical and legal English, as well as courses for overseas English teachers
 Academic English: includes preparatory courses for the University English Entry Course and the International English Languages Testing System (IELTS) tests, courses to meet admission requirements for the UNSW Foundation Studies program and UNSW tertiary programs, and general academic English programs.

Domestic students
Domestic students can undertake study in the following streams:
 Part-Time English Programs: courses include pronunciation, English for medical and business professionals, IELTS test preparation and English for jobseekers
 Test Preparation: assists students in preparing for  the IELTS Test, the Professional English Language for Teachers test, and the Occupational English Test for health care professionals
 Language Teacher Training: provides language teachers with qualifications for Teaching English to Speakers of Other Languages Teaching English for Overseas Teachers and teaching Languages Other than English (LOTE)
 Other Languages:  Part-time courses are offered in Arabic, Indonesian, Italian, French, Spanish, German, Mandarin, Japanese, Korean and Portuguese.

Elite Programs
The Institute offers a series of customised courses and study tours under the Elite Programs banner. These include short- and long-term English courses for languages teachers as well as tailored courses for university staff and groups of university students from partner institutions.

Testing Facilities
The UNSW Institute of Languages is a registered examination site for a range of Australian and international English and other language testing systems. The Institute administers the following examinations:
 IELTS
 Test of English as a Foreign Language (TOEFL)
 Professional English Assessment for Teachers (PEAT)
 Qantas/Jetstar Language Proficiency Certificate Test
 Tour Guides Language Proficiency Test
 Corporate tests
 Customised language proficiency tests

Campus
The UNSW Institute of Languages has purpose-built facilities at both UNSW’s Kensington and Randwick campuses in Sydney, Australia. In addition to accessing the Institute’s facilities, students taking languages courses can also access a range of UNSW facilities including the library, sports facilities and health centres.

References

External links 
 UNSW Global official website

University of New South Wales